The Keyton EX80 is a compact MPV made by the Keyton (Qiteng) brand of Fujian Motors Group from 2015.

Overview

The Keyton EX80 is a 7-seat MPV with 3-row reclining seats in a 2+2+3 configuration. The interior feature a medium sized touch screen and the infotainment system includes satellite navigation, MP4 movie player, MP3 music player, USB and Aux-in connectivity. The EX80 was launched in September 2015. Basic features include power windows, electronic mirrors, alloy wheels and fog lamps.

Powertrain
Power of the EX80 comes from a 1.5 liter four-cylinder petrol engine with 116hp, mated to a five-speed manual transmission.

Joylong EM5
The Joylong EM5 is an electric MPV made by Joylong based on the Keyton EX80, and is essentially an electrified rebadge version of the EX80. The EM5 has a max speed of 100 km/h and a 6.6kw battery. 

The dimensions of the EM5 is 4397 mm/1730 mm/1758 mm, and a wheelbase of 2721 mm. It has 5 doors and 7 seats, and costs $20,000 - $26,000.
The Joylong EM5 was shown alongside the EM3 at the 2019 Shanghai Auto Show.

See Also
Joylong

References

Cars introduced in 2015
Cars of China
Minivans
Front-wheel-drive vehicles